Cremnophila pyraustella is a species of snout moth in the genus Cremnophila. It was described by Zerny in 1914, and is known from China.

References

Moths described in 1914
Phycitini